Endoclita undulifer is a species of moth of the family Hepialidae. It is known from India. Food plants for this species include Alnus, Byttneria, Callicarpa, Cryptomeria, Eucalyptus, and Gmelina.

References

External links
Hepialidae genera

Moths described in 1869
Hepialidae